Jamila Umar Nagudu (born 10 August 1985) is a Nigerian actress working in Kannywood.

Early life and education 

Nagudu was born on 10 August 1985 in Magana Gumau, in Magana gumau, Toro Local Government Area of Bauchi State, Nigeria. She attended primary and secondary schools in Bauchi State.

Career 

Jamila Umar, better known as Jamila Umar Nagudu, made her film debut in the Kannywood industry in 2002, first as a dancer and later as an actor. She has appeared in both romantic movies and comedy films. She is often referred to as the "Queen of Kannywood". Director Aminu Saira was the first to cast her in the film "Jamila da Jamilu" as an actress. She was nominated for best of Nollywood in Abeokuta.

Ambassador 
Nagudu has an endorsement with companies like Ajinomoto and Globacom.

Personal life 

Nagudu is divorced and has a son.

Filmography

Awards

References 

1985 births
Nigerian film actresses
Living people
Actresses in Hausa cinema
21st-century Nigerian actresses
Hausa people
Kannywood actors